Sudol or Sudoł is a surname. Notable people with the surname include:

Alison Sudol (born 1984), American singer-songwriter, actress and music video director
Ed Sudol (1920–2004), American baseball player
Grzegorz Sudoł (born 1978), Polish race walker
Marius Sudol (born 1954), American biologist

See also
 

Polish-language surnames